Putra Nababan (born 28 July 1974) is an Indonesian newsreader, journalist and editor in chief of MetroTV. He has received four Panasonic Gobel awards.

Early life and education
Nababan was born with the name James Parulian Putra Nababan in Jakarta on 28 July 1974. According to his parents Panda Nababan and Ria Purba, the name James is used abroad, Parulian is used in his hometown, Putra is used throughout Indonesia, while Nababan is his family name. He is second of three children.

Nababan moved to Sioux City, Iowa, United States, in 1988 to continue his studies through a student exchange. He graduated from high school in one year. Influenced by his father, he chose to be a journalist. He enrolled in the department of journalism of Midland Lutheran College, Fremont, Nebraska, at the age of 16. He graduated three years later. During his time in college, he held a part-time job as a security guard for two years.

Career
After returning to Indonesia, Nababan worked for Forum Keadilan magazine, Koran Merdeka (later renamed Rakyat Merdeka), and Metro TV. He has worked for RCTI since 2004.

In 2008, PDI Perjuangan offered to make him a legislative candidate for the party in the 2009 election, but he refused. In March 2010, he interviewed US President Barack Obama about his childhood in Indonesia.

In the 2019 Indonesian legislative election, Nababan ran as a PDI-P candidate from Jakarta's 1st electoral district and won a seat in the People's Representative Council.

Awards
Nababan has received four Panasonic Gobel awards for Best News Presenter in 2009, 2010, 2011 and 2012.

Personal life
Nababan and Mira Maria Melati Sirait dated for nine and a half years before marrying on 14 February 2004; together they have two children, named Aubriel Mutiara Aza Nababan and Gabriel Indonesia Prinz Nababan.

References

External links 

 
 idtalent and his restlessness of Indonesia's talent crisis
  Putra Nababan di Penyiar.co.tv
  idtalent, dan Kegelisahannya Tentang Krisis Talent di Indonesia

Living people
1974 births
Indonesian journalists
People from Jakarta
People of Batak descent
Members of the People's Representative Council, 2019